Harald Ruckendorfer (born 5 December 1982) is an Austrian footballer who currently plays for Austrian team Vorwärts Steyr.

Club career
Ruckendorfer played at LASK Linz for seven years, before moving to Second division side 1. FC Vöcklabruck in January 2008.
In summer 2008 he joined Landesliga Ost outfit Steyr.

External links
Player profile - Vorwärts Steyr

1982 births
Living people
Austrian footballers
LASK players
SK Vorwärts Steyr players
Austrian Football Bundesliga players
Association football midfielders